Live! is a 1975 album by Bob Marley and the Wailers which was recorded live in concert during July 1975 at the Lyceum Theatre, London. "No Woman, No Cry (Live '75)" was released as a single.

Production
The band's two concerts at the Lyceum Theatre, London, on 17th and 18 July 1975, were recorded by Island Records employee Danny Holloway using the Rolling Stones Mobile Studio. The tracks for the album were selected mostly from the 17th July performance, with "Lively Up Yourself" (which wasn't played on the 17th) from the 18th.  Chris Blackwell had been at the first concert on the 17th, and had noted the audience's reaction to "No Woman, No Cry".

Production of the album was credited to Bob Marley and the Wailers, Steve Smith, and Chris Blackwell.

Release
The album was released on 5 December 1975 by Island Records as a vinyl LP. In 2001 it was released on CD. In 2016 a three disc release called the "Live! Deluxe Edition", became available in vinyl and CD formats, with recordings of both the 17 July and 18 July performances.

Reception

Reviewing Live! in Christgau's Record Guide: Rock Albums of the Seventies, Robert Christgau wrote, "The rushed tempos take their toll in aura: 'Trenchtown Rock' can be far more precise, painful, and ecstatic; like most live albums this relies on obvious material. But the material is also choice, unlike most live albums it's graced by distinct sound and economical arrangements, and the tempos force both singer and the band into moments of wild, unexpected intensity. I used to think Natty Dreads 'No Woman, No Cry' was definitive."

Track listing

Musicians
Bob Marley and the Wailers
Bob Marley – lead vocals, rhythm guitar
Carlton Barrett – drums
Aston "Family Man" Barrett – bass
Tyrone Downie – keyboards
Al Anderson – lead guitar
Alvin "Seeco" Patterson – percussion
with:
the "I Threes": (Rita Marley, Judy Mowatt, Marcia Griffiths) – backing vocals Note: Marcia Griffiths missed this tour because of pregnancy.

Personnel
Recorded at the Lyceum, London, 17 & 18 July 1975
Live sound mixing: Dave Harper
Live Monitor Engineer: CHIP CHASE (Eric Chipchase)
Live recording by Rolling Stones Mobile
Recording engineer: Steve Smith
Mixed at: Basing Street Studios
Mixing engineer: Phill Brown
Many thanks to Don Taylor and Dave Harper for making everything happen.
Bob Marley and the Wailers - produced the music
Steve Smith & Chris Blackwell - produced the record
Reissue supervised by Bill Levenson and Maxine Stowe with special thanks to the Marley Family and Chris Blackwell. 
Mastered from the original two track analog master tapes by Ted Jensen at Sterling Sound, New York, 2001.
Tape research by Jane Hitchin, David Lascelles, and Zoe Roberts at Universal Tape Library, London.
LIVE! (Island ILPS 9376) was originally released 5 December 1975.

Certifications

References

Bob Marley and the Wailers live albums
1975 live albums
Albums produced by Chris Blackwell
Island Records live albums
Tuff Gong albums